"Never Gone" is a song recorded by American recording artist Colton Dixon, who placed seventh on the eleventh season of American Idol. It was released September 25, 2012 as the first promotional single from his debut studio album, A Messenger (2013).

Background
After placing seventh on Idol, Colton went on the American Idols LIVE! Tour 2012 over the summer with the other contestants. He co-wrote the song "Never Gone," (with the production team composed of Andy Dodd, Adam Watts and Gannin Arnold who also produced the track) and performed it at the concerts he played in.

He would soon be signed to Sparrow Records and release his material through the label. The singer confirms debut single entitled "You Are" to impact U.S. radio on October 19, and the song "Never Gone" was released to iTunes in the U.S. on September 25, 2012.

Colton says that the song "sums up my American Idol experience. There were times when I felt like I was by myself, or just felt unplugged from reality. There were even times when I asked God if He was still there...He always answered "I was never gone.""

Covers
On the twelfth season of American Idol, Angie Miller performed this song during the semi-finals on March 5, 2013.

Since Angie Miller performed it on Idol, Dixon decided to have a "Never Gone" cover contest, where his band will pick the three best videos and will get prizes from the Colton Dixon store.

Chart performance
Never Gone entered the Christian Digital Songs and Christian/Gospel Digital Songs at No. 1 in both charts.

Weekly charts

Release history

References

2012 singles
2012 songs
Songs written by Adam Watts (musician)
Songs written by Andy Dodd
Sparrow Records singles